Contra La Corriente (English: Against the Current) is the second album of Puerto Rican singer, Janina, who became known after winning the first season of talent-reality show Objetivo Fama. The album was released on September 26, 2006 and produced by Univision Music Group.

So far, the album has produced the hit single: "Contra La Corriente" that received heavy airplay in Puerto Rican radio stations. Recently, the second single, "Sentir en la Vida", has been released to much acclaim. This song was written by Jeremías.

Track listing
"Contra La Corriente"
"Pasajero"
"Es Posible"
"Ven por Favor"
"Armas Blancas"
"Actitud (Attitude)"
"Al Final"
"Siento"
"Dejame Olvidar"
"Dime"
"Sentir en La Vida"
"Nada Se Compara Contigo"
"Contra La Corriente" (Pop version)
"Actitud (Attitude)" (English version)

References

2006 albums